The political history of Africa in the 2020s covers political events on the continent, other than elections, from 2020 onwards.

History by country

Algeria 
In July 2021, Amnesty International and Forbidden Stories reported, that Morocco had targeted more than 6,000 Algerian phones, including those of politicians and high-ranking military officials, with the Pegasus spyware. In August 2021, Algeria blamed Morocco and Israel of supporting the Movement for the self-determination of Kabylia, which the Algerian President Abdelmadjid Tebboune accused of being involved in the wildfires in northern Algeria. Tebboune accused Morocco for perpetrating hostile acts. In the same month, King Mohammed VI of Morocco reached out for reconciliation with Algeria and offered assistance in Algeria's battle against the fires. Algeria did not respond to the offer.

On 18 August 2021, Tebboune chaired an extraordinary meeting of the High Security Council to review Algeria's relations to Morocco. The president ordered an intensification of security controls at the borders. On 24 August 2021, Algerian foreign minister Ramtane Lamamra announced the break of diplomatic relations with Morocco. On 27 August 2021, Morocco closed the country's embassy in Algiers, Algeria. Furthermore, on 22 September 2021, Algeria's Supreme Security Council determined to close its airspace to all Moroccan civilian and military aircraft.

Burkina Faso

Chad 
Presidential elections were held in Chad on 11 April 2021. Incumbent Idriss Déby, who served five consecutive terms since seizing power in the 1990 coup d'état, was running for a sixth. Déby was described as an authoritarian by several international media sources, and as "strongly entrenched". During previous elections, he forbade the citizens of Chad from making posts online, and while Chad's total ban on social media use was lifted in 2019, restrictions continue to exist.

Provisional results released on April 19 showed that incumbent president Idriss Déby won reelection with 79% of the vote. However, on 20 April it was announced by the military that Déby had been killed in action while leading his country's troops in a battle against rebels calling themselves the Front for Change and Concord in Chad (FACT).

Following president Déby's death, a body called the Transitional Military Council – led by his son Mahamat Déby Itno, dissolved the government and the legislature, and proclaimed that it would be assuming power for a period of 18 months. Thereafter, a new presidential election would be held. Some political actors within Chad have labeled the installing of the transitional military government a "coup", as the constitutional provisions regarding the filling of a presidential vacancy were not followed. Namely, according to the constitution, the President of the National Assembly, Haroun Kabadi, should have been named Acting President after Déby's death, and an early election called within a period of no less than 45 and no more than 90 days from the time of the vacancy.

Democratic Republic of Congo 
Thirty-two members of the Parliament of the Democratic Republic of the Congo died of COVID-19.

Eswatini 
The Prime Minister Ambrose Mandvulo Dlamini died of COVID-19 in 2020.

A series of protests in Eswatini against the monarchy and for democratisation began in late June 2021. Starting as a peaceful protest on 20 June, they escalated after 25 June into violence and looting over the weekend as the government took a hardline stance against the demonstrations and prohibited the delivery of petitions.

Ethiopia 
Tensions began to rise again between Ethiopia and Eritrea, after several years of efforts to negotiate peace, due to possible border disputes.

After having won the Nobel Peace Prize in 2019, Prime Minister Abiy Ahmed's government adopted some policies which raised some concerns about political developments in Ethiopia. Abiy dissolved the governing coalition and formed a new party, the Prosperity Party; some said the imposition of a brand-new political party was detrimental to political stability. Also, the government enacted some restrictions on some forms of expression which raised concern about standards of free speech. Abiy's response to rebel groups has raised some concerns about undue harshness, although some others allege that he was originally too lenient. Amnesty International raised concerns about the status of one opposition leader. Abiy encouraged Ethiopian refugees to return home, due to improving conditions.

On November 4, 2020, the Ethiopian National Defense Force launched a civil war against the Tigray People's Liberation Front (TPLF) in the Tigray Region, which it claimed was in response to an attack on its troops. This followed month of feuding between the central and regional governments over elections and funding. The Tigray forces launched rockets at the airport of Asmara, capital of neighbouring Eritrea, claiming that forces from there had taken part in the offensive. Amnesty International reported that a massacre had taken place in Tigray, with TPLF-affiliated forces claimed to be responsible.

Theres was also another conflict ongoing in the Oromia Region.

Concurrently, there were also ongoing Afar–Somali clashes between the Afar and Somali Regions of Ethiopia. In October 2020, 27 people were killed. On 2 April 2021, 100 cattle herders were reportedly shot dead. On July 24, 2021, clashes erupted in the town of Garbaiisa, the clashes killing 300 were followed by massive protests in the Somali region resulting in the only road and rail line that goes into Djibouti where 95% of Ethiopia's maritime trade goes though.

Guinea 
In 2020, President of Guinea Alpha Condé changed the constitution by referendum to allow himself to secure a third term, a controversial change which spurred the 2019–2020 Guinean protests. During the last year of the second term and his third term, Condé cracked down on protests and on opposition candidates, some of whom died in prison, while the government struggled to contain price increases in basic commodities. On 5 September 2021, Condé was captured by the country's armed forces in a coup d'état after gunfire in the capital, Conakry. Special forces commander Mamady Doumbouya released a broadcast on state television announcing the dissolution of the constitution and government.

Guinea-Bissau 
A coup d'état was attempted in Guinea-Bissau on 1 February 2022. A few hours later, president Umaro Sissoco Embaló declared the coup over, he said that "many" members of the security forces had been killed in a "failed attack against democracy."

Kenya 
The Camp Simba attack by Al-Shabaab in January 2020 killed three Americans.

Lesotho 
On 10 January 2020, an arrest warrant was issued for First Lady Maesiah Thabane, who was wanted in connection with the 2017 murder of Lipolelo Thabane. Maesaih Thabane went into hiding and Prime Minister Tom Thabane announced his intent to resign from office shortly after her arrest warrant was issued. On 20 February 2020, police announced that Thabane would also be charged with murder in the case.

Libya 
A conference between representatives of Mediterranean Basin powers implicated in the Libyan armed conflict as well as Algeria, the Republic of Congo and major world powers took place in Berlin on 19 January 2020, declaring a 55-point list of Conclusions, creating a military 5+5 GNA+LNA followup committee, and an International Follow-up Committee to monitor progress in the peace process. In the intra-Libyan component of the 3-point process, the economic track was launched on 6 January 2020 in a meeting in Tunis between a diverse selection of 19 Libyan economic experts. The military track of the intra-Libyan negotiations started on 3 February with the 5+5 Libyan Joint Military Commission meeting in Geneva, between 5 senior military officers selected by the GNA and 5 selected by the LNA leader Khalifa Haftar. A major aim was to negotiate detailed monitoring to strengthen the 12 January ceasefire. The intra-Libyan political track was started on 26 February 2020 in Geneva. Salamé resigned from his UNSMIL position in early March 2020.

A 21 August 2020 announcement by GNA leader Fayez al-Sarraj and Aguila Saleh for the LNA declared a ceasefire, lifting of the oil blockade, the holding of parliamentary and presidential elections in March 2021, and a new joint presidential council to be guarded by a joint security force in Sirte. Followup meetings took place in Montreux on 7–9 September with support from UNSMIL and the Centre for Humanitarian Dialogue and, between five GNA and five House of Representatives (HoR) members on 11 September, in Bouznika. Both meetings appeared to achieve consensus.

The three-track intra-Libyan negotiations, chaired by Stephanie Williams of UNSMIL, continued following the August ceasefire and September Montreux meeting, with the political track evolving into the Libyan Political Dialogue Forum, and the military track leading to a 24 October 2020 agreement on a permanent ceasefire.

Malawi 
The Constitutional Court ordered a re-run of the 2019 Malawian general election following “widespread, systematic and grave” problems with the process, leading to the 2020 Malawian presidential election.

Mali 
On 18 August 2020, elements of the Malian Armed Forces began a coup. Soldiers on pick-up trucks stormed the Soundiata military base in the town of Kati, where gunfire was exchanged before weapons were distributed from the armory and senior officers arrested. Tanks and armoured vehicles were seen on the town's streets, as well as military trucks heading for the capital, Bamako. The soldiers detained several government officials including the President Ibrahim Boubacar Keïta who resigned and dissolved the government.

The 2021 Malian coup d'état began on the night of 24 May 2021 when the Malian Army led by Vice President Assimi Goïta captured President Bah N'daw, Prime Minister Moctar Ouane and Minister of Defence Souleymane Doucouré. Assimi Goïta, the head of the junta that led the 2020 coup d'état, announced that N'daw and Ouane were stripped of their powers and that new elections would be held in 2022. It is the country's third coup d'état in ten years, following the 2012 and 2020 military takeovers with the latter only having happened nine months earlier. The African Union suspended the country's membership in response. On July 20, a knifeman wounded  President Goïta in the arm at a mosque in Bamako in an attack described as an assassination attempt.

Morocco 
In November 2020, the Polisario Front declared it had broken a 30-year truce and attacked Moroccan forces in Western Sahara as part of the Western Sahara conflict.

Mozambique 
The insurgency in Cabo Delgado intensified with events such as the 2020 Mozambique attacks, the Mocímboa da Praia offensive in 2020 and the Battle of Palma in 2021.

Niger 
The 2021 Nigerien coup attempt occurred on 31 March 2021 at around 3:00 am WAT (2:00 am UTC) after gunfire erupted in the streets of Niamey, the capital of Niger, two days before the inauguration of president-elect Mohamed Bazoum. The coup was staged by elements within the military. After it was foiled, the perpetrators were arrested.

Nigeria 
The End SARS movement protested the abuses committed by the Special Anti-Robbery Squad, but were met with violence which killed at least 12 people.

Somalia 
On 14 April 2021, acting President Somalia Mohamed Abdullahi Mohamed signed a law which extended his mandate by two years. This was opposed by opposition leaders which called it "a threat to the stability, peace and unity" and by the international community. On 25 April 2021, soldiers - mainly from Hirshabelle - entered Mogadishu in response. Rebels seized northern part of the city clashing with pro-government forces in some neighborhoods. Pro-government soldiers attacked homes of former Somali president and opposition leader. By the end of the day government forces withdrew towards Villa Somalia. On 6 May 2021, soldiers agreed to withdraw from Mogadishu after series of talks with the Prime Minister, held by the opposition. The police were set to take control of the city.

The 2021 Somali political crisis was triggered after president Mohamed Abdullahi Mohamed's term ended on 8 February 2021. Political turmoil escalated, with anti-government protests occurring after the government's decision to delay the 2021 Somali presidential election. Tensions rose when heavy gunfire was reported during demonstrations on 19–20 February in Mogadishu. The protesters were aiming to stage protest rallies over the next weeks and call for the 2021 Somali presidential election to be scheduled as quick as possible to end the political crisis and turmoil.

On 27 December 2021, President Mohamed Abdullahi Mohamed announced the suspension of Prime Minister Mohammed Hussein Roble for suspected corruption, which was described by Roble as a coup attempt. The next day, hundreds of soldiers loyal to Roble armed with rocket grenades and machine guns encircled the presidential palace.

Presidential elections were held in Somalia in 15 May 2022. The election was held indirectly and after the elections for the House of the People, which began on 1 November 2021 and ended on 13 April 2022.

After three rounds, involving 38 candidates, parliamentary officials counted more than 165 votes in favour of Hassan Sheikh Mohamud, more than the number required to defeat the incumbent president. He was declared president in a peaceful transition of power after the incumbent president conceded defeat and congratulated the victor. Celebratory gunfire rang out in parts of Mogadishu. The United Nations in Somalia welcomed the conclusion of the election, praising the “positive” nature of the electoral process and peaceful transfer of power.

South Africa 
Former president Jacob Zuma was taken into custody after declining to testify at the Zondo Commission, an inquiry into allegations of corruption during his term as president from 2009 to 2018. The Constitutional Court reserved judgement on Zuma's application to rescind his sentence on 12 July 2021.

Riots and protests took place in South Africa from Friday, 9 July 2021 until Saturday, 17th July 2021, in response to the arrest of Zuma. The riots triggered wider rioting and looting fueled by job layoffs and economic inequality worsened by the COVID-19 pandemic.  The unrest began in the province of KwaZulu-Natal on the evening of 9 July, and spread to the province of Gauteng on the evening of 11 July.

South Sudan 
The South Sudanese Civil War ended with a negotiated peace treaty. In January 2020, the Community of Sant'Egidio mediated a Rome Peace Declaration between the SSOMA and the South Sudanese government. The most contentious issue delaying the formation of the unity government was whether South Sudan should keep 32 or return to 10 states. On 14 February 2020, Kiir announced South Sudan would return to 10 states in addition to three administrative areas of Abyei, Pibor, and Ruweng, and on 22 February Riek Machar was sworn in as first vice president for the creation of the unity government, ending the civil war. Disarmament campaigns led by the government has led to resistance, with clashes killing more than 100 people in two days in north-central Tonj in August 2020.

Sudan 
In January 2020, progress was made in peace negotiations, in the areas of land, transitional justice and system of government issues via the Darfur track of negotiations. SRF and Sovereignty Council representatives agreed on the creation of a Special Court for Darfur to conduct investigations and trials for war crimes and crimes against humanity carried out during the War in Darfur by the al-Bashir presidency and by warlords. Two Areas negotiations with SPLM-N (al-Hilu) had progressed on six framework agreement points, after a two-week pause, but disagreement remained on SPLM-N (al-Hilu)'s requirement of a secular state in South Kordofan and Nuba Mountains and Blue Nile self-determination. On 24 January on the Two Areas track, political and security agreements, constituting a framework agreement, were signed by Hemetti on behalf of the Sovereignty Council and Ahmed El Omda Badi on behalf of SPLM-N (Agar). The agreements give legislative autonomy to South Kordofan and Blue Nile; propose solutions for the sharing of land and other resources, and aim to unify all militias and government soldiers into a single unified Sudanese military body.

On 26 January, a "final" peace agreement for the northern track, including issues of studies for new dams, compensation for people displaced by existing dams, road construction and burial of electronic and nuclear waste, was signed by Shamseldin Kabashi of the Sovereignty Council and Dahab Ibrahim of the Kush Movement.

In February 2020, a new unity government was announced, to govern the entire country, with the support of all sides of the conflict. As one part of the agreement, the current cabinet was disbanded, in order to enable more opposition members to be appointed to cabinet roles. In March 2020, negotiators and officials on both sides of the conflict attempted to work out arrangements to facilitate the appointment of civilian governors for various regions, in concert with ongoing peace efforts. The EU announced its support for the peace efforts and pledged to provide financial support of 100 million Euros.

The September 2021 Sudanese coup d'état attempt was a coup attempt against the Sovereignty Council of Sudan on Tuesday 21 September 2021. According to media reports, at least 40 officers were arrested at dawn on Tuesday 21 September 2021. A government spokesman said they included "remnants of the defunct regime", referring to former officials of President Omar al-Bashir's government, and members of the country's armoured corps.

On 25 October 2021, the Sudanese military, led by General Abdel Fattah al-Burhan, took control of the government in a military coup. At least five senior government figures were initially detained. Civilian Prime Minister Abdalla Hamdok refused to declare support for the coup and on 25 October called for popular resistance; he was moved to house arrest on 26 October. Some civilian groups including the Sudanese Professionals Association and Forces of Freedom and Change called for civil disobedience and refusal to cooperate with the coup organisers. Protests took place on 25 and 26 October against the coup and at least 10 civilians were reported as being killed and over 140 injured by the military during the first day of protests.

Tunisia 
The 2021 Tunisian political crisis began on 25 July 2021, after Tunisian President Kais Saied dismissed Prime Minister Hichem Mechichi and suspended the activities of the Assembly of the Representatives of the People by invoking emergency powers from Article 80 of the Tunisian Constitution. The decisions of the president were made in response to a series of protests against Ennahda, economic hardship and spike in COVID-19 cases in Tunisia. The speaker of the Tunisian parliament and leader of the Ennahda Movement Rached Ghannouchi said the president's actions were an assault on democracy and called on his supporters to take to the streets in opposition.

On 24 August, Saied extended the suspension of parliament although the constitution states the parliament can only be suspended for a month, raising concerns in some quarters about the future of democracy in the country. On 22 September, President Saied issued a decree that grants him full presidential powers with the potential of the change of Tunisia's constitution, its transformation into a presidential republic and maybe even the dissolution of the parliament. Earlier that day, Seifeddine Makhlouf and Fayçal Tebbini, both members of parliament were jailed.

In October 2021, Saied appointed Najla Bouden Romdhane as the first female prime minister in Tunisia and the Arab world. On February 6, Kais Saied dissolved the country's top independent judiciary, a move that was condemned by the opposition as a power grab.  On February 24, 2022, Saied announced that foreign funding for civil society organizations will be prohibited. He said, "Non-governmental organisations must be prevented from accessing external funds... and we will do that."

Uganda 
Unrest killed at least 45 people after the arrest of opposition leader Bobi Wine in the runup to the 2021 Ugandan general election. In June 2021, four gunmen on a car opened fire against a convoy carrying Ugandan Minister of Transport Katumba Wamala, injuring him and killing his daughter and driver.

Zambia 
Zambia faces sovereign default as the first sub-Saharan African country since 2005 due to economic mismanagement by the government of Edgar Lungu, who has grown public debt from 32% to 120% and has scared off investment by seizing mines. Debt servicing takes up four times more money from the budget than healthcare. Much of the money is believed to have been lost to corruption. The main opposition leader Hakainde Hichilema has been arrested. The electoral roll has been nulled and only 30 days have been given for re-registration. Comparisons have been drawn to neighbouring Zimbabwe.

See also 

 2020s in political history

References 

2020s in Africa
2020s in politics
politics
2020s in international relations
2020s decade overviews